The intermediate station Calle 40 Sur is part of the TransMilenio mass-transit system of Bogotá, Colombia, opened in the year 2000.

Location
The station is located in southern Bogotá, specifically on Avenida Caracas with Calles 39 and 41B sur.

It serves Santa Lucía, Inglés, and Claret neighborhoods.

History
At the beginning of 2001, the second phase of the Caracas line of the system was opened from Tercer Milenio to the intermediate station Calle 40 Sur. A few months later, service was extended south to Portal de Usme.

The station is named Calle 40 Sur due to its proximity to that major road.

Station Services

Old trunk services

Main line service

Feeder routes
The following feeder routes are served on the eastern side of the station:

 Uribe Uribe loop
 El Tunal loop
 Inglés loop

Inter-city service
This station does not have inter-city service.

See also
Bogotá
TransMilenio
List of TransMilenio Stations

TransMilenio
2001 establishments in Colombia